Juan Benet (7 October 1927 – 5 January 1993) was a Spanish novelist, dramatist and essayist who also worked as a civil engineer.

Early life
Benet was born in Madrid. At the start of the Spanish Civil War, his father was killed, and he left for San Sebastián with his family to find refuge. They stayed there until 1939, when they returned to the capital. In 1944, he completed his high school education and in 1948 he entered into the School of Civil Engineering in Madrid. He frequented the discussion group at Café Gijón, in Madrid, where he met the man who would become his best friend, Luis Martín Santos, among other authors of that time.

In 1953, still a student, he started an engineering internship in Finland and published his first play, Max, in which one can see the beginnings of a singular literary style that distances itself from the popular themes of Spanish literature of that era.

In 1954, Benet finished his engineering degree, and in the following year he married. After completing several works in Switzerland, he moved to Ponferrada in Léon, and after to Oviedo, for work-related reasons.

Writing years

First stage
In 1961, Benet published Nunca llegarás a nada (You Will Never Amount to Anything), his first novel.

There were already those calling his work "incorrect literature," and only a few contemporary authors, such as Pere Gimferrer, who believed that a great narrative writer had been born. In 1967, Benet was awarded the Premio Biblioteca Breve for his work, Una meditación (A meditation).

He wrote La inspiración y el estilo (Inspiration and style), an essay where he expounded his strong beliefs on art and literature, an art that is fundamentally about style more than about telling stories or making arguments.

His literary output increased between 1970 and 1973, as he published Una meditación, Un viaje de invierno (A Winter Journey), completing the trilogy that began with Volverás a Región,  Puerta de tierra, Teatro, and Una tumba, La otra casa de Mazón and Sub rosa.

Second stage
In 1974, his wife, Nuria Jordana, died, causing a break in Benet's works and in his personal relationships. More introverted than ever, Benet didn't publish another work until 1976's Qué fue la guerra civil (What Was the Civil War). Until the 1980s he would travel extensively, including trips to China and to various conferences in the United States.

In 1980, he published one of his greatest works, Saúl ante Samuel (Saul Before Samuel), a complex work that received good critical notice. He was a finalist for the Planeta Prize in 1980 with his work El aire de un crimen, losing to Volaverunt by Antonio Larreta. Three years after, the first volume of Herrumbrosas lanzas (Rusty lances) was published. He continued this work with two more volumes published in 1985 and 1986.

While he was building his own engineering firm, he published the novel En la penumbra (In the Penumbra) in 1989. In 1990 and 1991, he published his final two works, the essay La construcción de la torre de Babel (The Construction of the Tower of Babel) and El caballero de Sajonia (The Knight of Saxony). He left the fourth volume of Herrumbrosas lanzas unfinished at his death on January 5, 1993.

Legacy
In the 1980s, there began a very intense debate on his works that would continue after his death. The singular character of his works set his style apart from the narrativism of Spanish authors of the second half of the 20th century. The influence of William Faulkner is evident in all of his works.

Recognized today as one of the greatest Spanish writers of the 20th century, the Times on January 18, 1993, compared him with France's Marcel Proust, Ireland's James Joyce, and the U.S. writer Faulkner.

References

External links
 James Kirkup. Obituary: Juan Benet, ''The Independent, 8 January 1993; consulted: 9 September 2011
 

1927 births
1993 deaths
Writers from Madrid
Spanish male dramatists and playwrights
Spanish male novelists
20th-century Spanish novelists
20th-century Spanish dramatists and playwrights
20th-century Spanish male writers